DeAndré Washington (born February 22, 1993) is a former American football running back. He played college football at Texas Tech, and was drafted by the Oakland Raiders in the fifth round of the 2016 NFL Draft.

Early years
Washington attended and played high school football at Thurgood Marshall High School. He committed to play college football at Texas Tech after receiving offers from schools such as Arizona, Baylor, Colorado, and Boise State.

College career
Washington suffered a knee injury as a true freshman in 2011 after rushing for 366 yards and three touchdowns. He redshirted in 2012 and came back and rushed for 450 yards and four touchdowns in 2013. As a junior in 2014, he rushed for 1,103 yards and two touchdowns and finished with 328 receiving yards and two touchdowns. As a senior, he rushed for 248 yards, including a career-long 80-yard touchdown run, against Kansas State on November 14, 2015. He finished his senior year leading the Big 12 with 1,492 yards and 14 touchdowns along with 385 receiving yards and two touchdowns which was good enough for 1st-team All-Big 12 honors. He finished his career fifth on Texas Tech's all-time rushing list behind Byron Hanspard, James Gray, Ricky Williams, and Bam Morris.

Professional career
Coming out of college, Washington was projected by many analysts to be a fifth to seventh round draft selection. He was rated the 16th best running back out of the 204 available by NFLDraftScout.com. He was invited to the NFL Combine and was able to complete the entire workout and all the positional drills. He was satisfied enough with his combine performance that he chose to only do positional drills at Texas Tech's Pro Day. Representatives and scouts from all 32 NFL teams showed up at the Pro Day to watch Washington, Jakeem Grant, Le'Raven Clark, and Branden Jackson.

Oakland Raiders
Washington was drafted by the Raiders in the fifth round (143rd overall) in the 2016 NFL Draft. The Raiders previously traded wide receiver Brice Butler to the Dallas Cowboys to obtain the selection used to select Washington.

2016 season
On May 10, 2016, the Oakland Raiders signed Washington to a four-year, $2.60 million contract with a signing bonus of $269,195.

He entered training camp competing for the backup running back position with George Atkinson III, Jalen Richard, Roy Helu, and Taiwan Jones. Washington was named the Raider's third running back on their depth chart behind Latavius Murray and Taiwan Jones.

He made his professional regular season debut in the Raiders' season opening victory against the New Orleans Saints. Washington finished his debut with five carries for 14 rushing yards and one reception for 10 receiving yards. On September 25, 2016, Washington carried the ball six times for a season-high 57 rushing yards and had one five yard reception in a 17–10 victory over the Tennessee Titans. On October 16, 2016, he earned his first career start during a 10–26 loss to the Kansas City Chiefs and finished the game with a season-high ten carries for 49 rushing yards. Washington scored his first two touchdowns in Week 16 against the Indianapolis Colts. He finished the 2016 season with 87 carries for 467 rushing yards and two rushing touchdowns. In the Wild Card Round of the playoffs, he had four carries for 16 rushing yards in the loss to the Houston Texans.

2017 season

In the offseason leading into the 2017 season, the Oakland Raiders added veteran running back Marshawn Lynch to the backfield. The addition of Lynch limited Washington's production in 2017. Overall, he finished with 57 carries for 153 rushing yards and two rushing touchdowns to go along with 34 receptions for 197 yards and a receiving touchdown.

2018 season
Under new head coach Jon Gruden, Washington's role remained similar to the previous season. In ten games, he had 30 carries for 115 rushing yards.

2019 season
In the 2019 season, Washington recorded 108 carries for 387 rushing yards and three rushing touchdowns to go along with 36 receptions for 292 receiving yards.

Kansas City Chiefs
On April 15, 2020, the Kansas City Chiefs signed Washington to a one-year contract. On September 5, 2020, he was released. He was signed to the practice squad the following day. He was promoted to the active roster on October 8.

Miami Dolphins
On November 3, 2020, Washington, along with a seventh-round pick in the 2021 NFL Draft, were traded to the Miami Dolphins in exchange for a sixth-round draft pick.

NFL statistics

Regular season

Postseason

References

External links

Texas Tech Red Raiders bio

1993 births
Living people
American football running backs
Kansas City Chiefs players
Miami Dolphins players
Oakland Raiders players
People from Missouri City, Texas
Players of American football from Texas
Sportspeople from Harris County, Texas
Texas Tech Red Raiders football players